Nittany is an unincorporated community and census-designated place in Walker Township, Centre County, Pennsylvania, United States. As of the 2010 census, the population was 658.

It is located along the northeastern border of Centre County, next to Lamar in Clinton County. It lies in the Nittany Valley, between the long ridge of Nittany Mountain to the southeast and lower Sand Ridge to the northwest. The center of Nittany is at the intersections of PA Routes 64 and 445. PA 64 leads northeast through Lamar  to Interstate 80 and southwest  to Zion, while PA 445 leads southeast across Nittany and Brush mountains  to Millheim.

Demographics

References

Census-designated places in Centre County, Pennsylvania
Census-designated places in Pennsylvania